Abraçaço is an album by Brazilian singer, songwriter, and guitarist Caetano Veloso, released in 2012 on Universal Records.

In November 2013, the album won the Latin Grammy of Best Singer-Songwriter Album. The song "Um Abraçaço" was also nominated for Record of the Year, Song of the Year and Latin Grammy Award for Best Brazilian Song. In the following year, a live version of the song "A Bossa Nova é Foda" was nominated for 2014 Latin Grammy's song of the Year and Best Brazilian Song.

The album was elected the best 2012 Brazilian album by Rolling Stone Brasil and "A Bossa Nova é Foda" was considered by the same magazine as the third best Brazilian song of the same year.

Track listing 
 "A Bossa Nova É Foda" - 3:54
 "Um Abraçaço" - 3:50
 "Estou Triste" - 5:13
 "O Império da Lei" - 4:07
 "Quero Ser Justo" - 3:52
 "Um Comunista" - 8:33
 "Funk Melódico" - 4:38
 "Vinco" - 5:40
 "Quando o Galo Cantou" - 3:46
 "Parabéns" - 3:06
 "Gayana" - 4:25

Personnel 
 Caetano Veloso - lead vocals, acoustic guitar
Banda Cê
 Pedro Sá - electric guitar, background vocals
 Ricardo Dias Gomes - bass, keyboards, background vocals
 Marcelo Callado - drums, percussion background vocals

Special guests
 Thalma de Freitas, Nina Becker, Lan Lan & Alinne Moraes - background vocals on "Parabéns"
 Moreno Veloso - bass and cymbals on "Gayana"

Production
 Moreno Veloso - production, recording, mixing
 Pedro Sá - production
 Daniel Carvalho - recording, mixing
 Felipe Fernandes, Leo Moreira, Pedro Tambellini - recording/mixing assistants
 Ricardo Garcia - mastering at Magic Master, Rio de Janeiro

Additional personnel
 Arrangements: Caetano Veloso, Pedro Sá, Ricardo Dias Gomes & Marcelo Callado
 Art direction and photography: Fernando Young and Tonho Quinta-Feira
 Styling: Felipe Veloso
 Review of texts: Luiz Augusto
 Graphics coordinator: Geysa Adnet
 Artistic Direction (Universal Music): Paul Ralphes

Charts

Weekly charts

References 

2012 albums
Caetano Veloso albums
Universal Records albums
Latin Grammy Award for Best Singer-Songwriter Album